Thorius munificus is a species of salamander in the family Plethodontidae. It is endemic to Mexico and only known from near its type locality near Las Vigas, Veracruz. Its natural habitats are pine-oak and pine forests, woodlands, and Arbutus forests with abundant shrubby and ericaceous plants. The species is threatened by habitat loss caused by logging, agriculture, and human settlement.

References

Thorius
Endemic amphibians of Mexico
Fauna of the Trans-Mexican Volcanic Belt
Amphibians described in 1998
Taxonomy articles created by Polbot